UB40 is the eighth album by British reggae band UB40, released on the DEP International label in 1988. This album contained the hit single "Breakfast in Bed" with Chrissie Hynde, which reached No. 6 in the UK charts.

Track listing
All tracks composed and arranged by UB40; except where indicated
"Dance With the Devil" – 5:43 
"Come Out to Play" – 3:15 *
"Breakfast in Bed" (Eddie Hinton, Donnie Fritts) - Dusty Springfield Cover  – 3:21 *
"You're Always Pulling Me Down" – 4:02
"I Would Do For You" – 5:36 *
"'Cause It Isn't True" – 2:58
"Where Did I Go Wrong" – 3:52 *
"Contaminated Minds" – 4:48
"Matter of Time" – 3:22
"Music So Nice" – 3:41
"Dance with the Devil (Reprise)" – 2:16

UK Singles *

Personnel
Dee Johnson, Linda Sandiford – backing vocals
Patrick Tenyue – guest trumpet
Henry Tenyue – guest trombone
Neil Ferris – Thai bells

Technical
Steve Masterson – cover painting

Charts

Certifications

References

1988 albums
UB40 albums